Andranolalina  is a town and commune in Madagascar. It belongs to the district of Midongy-Atsimo, which is a part of Atsimo-Atsinanana Region. There are 1534 inscribed electors in this commune.

Main town is Andranolalina but the commune also covers the neighboring villages of:
Ampatramary
Mahasoa Analatelo
Haramanga
Ambararata, Andranolalina
Anevandava
Ampatranila
Antanambao, Andranolalina
Antanandava, Andranolalina

References and notes 

Populated places in Atsimo-Atsinanana